Dieni railway station is a railway station in the municipality of Tujetsch, in the Swiss canton of Grisons. It is an intermediate stop on the  gauge Furka Oberalp line of the Matterhorn Gotthard Bahn.

Services 
The following services stop at Dieni:

References

External links 
 
 

Railway stations in Graubünden
Matterhorn Gotthard Bahn stations